Petergensfeld is a district of the Belgian municipality of Raeren in the German-speaking community. It is located directly on the German-Belgian border and represents the western continuation of the German village Roetgen.

Petergensfeld is located around 18 kilometers southeast of Aachen on the northeastern edge of the High Fens on the river Weser.

In addition to the standard German taught in school and used in the community, the traditional regional "Platt" is a Ripuarian dialect.

References

Raeren